T. montana may refer to:

Tegenaria montana, a funnel-web spider
Thamnosma montana, a shrub, turpentine broom
Thermopsis montana, mountain goldenbanner
Thyretes montana, a moth of the family Erebidae
Tillandsia montana, a plant of the family Bromeliaceae
Tinguarra montana, a plant of the family Apiaceae
Tolidostena montana, a beetle of the family Mordellidae
Tolpia montana, a moth of the family Erebidae
Trichosalpinx montana, an orchid
Tricula montana, a freshwater snail
Trifurcula montana, a moth of the family Nepticulidae
Triteleia montana, mountain triteleia, a plant of the family Asparagaceae
Trochocarpa montana, mountain tree heath, an Australian shrub
Tupaia montana, the mountain treeshrew